Poochandi  (Tamil: பூச்சாண்டி) or Poosandi Varan (பூசாண்டி வரான்) is a 2022 Malaysian Tamil-language horror thriller film. It tells the story of a journalist from India who comes to Malaysia for his true ghost stories project and encounters a frightening supernatural entity that is haunting a group of friends.

The film receives positive reviews. It is released in cinemas on 27 January 2022 in Malaysia and Singapore, and is released on 1 April 2022 at cinemas in Tamil Nadu, India.

Synopsis 
Thrill-seeking horror story magazine journalist Murugan (RJ Ramana) travels to Malaysia to collect local true ghost stories and look for folks with paranormal stories. What started as an ordinary story search turns into a horrific life-changing mystery when he encounters Shankar (Tinesh Sarathi Krishnan), who shares a spine-chilling paranormal experience that happened to him and his friends. Did they all survive?

"Poochandi" is a Tamil term used by South Indians to frighten children, which refers to the bogeyman.

Plot 
An image of a scarecrow is what we get in the initial frames after which we are introduced to Murugan (Ramana), a Tamil journalist from Madurai, who writes paranormal stories for a magazine in Malaysia. On his journey, he meets Shankar (Tinesh Sarathi Krishnan), who narrates a paranormal incident that happened to him and his friends Anbu (Logan Nathan) and Guru (Ganeshan Manoharan). Anbu has paralysis and he collects coins as a hobby. One day, they use one of the oldest coins in his collection to play Ouija and call out to a spirit for fun. Little do they realise that they are inviting a soul that's dangerous and mysterious in many ways. As the film progresses, the soul begins to entice them into accomplishing its own desires.
Once they start unraveling the spirit's past, they stumble upon a historic connection that dates back to many centuries. These friends come across a chilling twist at the interval point, and post that, the film turns into an investigative thriller that tries to decode the origin of the lost soul.

Cast

Release 
The film is rated PG13. The film is originally set to be released during Deepavali season in November 2021 after delays due to COVID-19, but was eventually released in cinema nationwide on 22 January 2022 in Malaysia. The theme song of the film is "Poochandi Varaan", composed and sang by Ganessan Manohgaran.

The film's was renamed as Poosandi Varan (பூசாண்டி வரான்) for release at cinemas in Tamil Nadu, India because of the presence of an upcoming Indian film of the same name. It is released on 1 April 2022 in cinemas statewide at Tamil Nadu, India.

During its original release, the film receives positive reviews from Malaysian and Singaporean critics and audience. It gained positive word-of-mouth in the weeks of its release and has managed to collect over RM 800,000 becoming the third highest-grossing local Malaysian Tamil-language film.

Reception 
Logesh Balachandran Critic from Times of india gave 3.5 out of 5 stars and noted that "The frames look stunning, given the fact that the film was shot under constraints in Malaysia. Moreover, the director also leaves us with the promise of a sequel, which definitely might require a massive budget.".Dina Thanthi Critic gave mixture of review and noted that "Director JK Vicky is scary in the way the story is told. Mallika's hostel room scenes and the climactic scene are perfect scares. There is no explanation as to why the one who is shown to be Shivanati, comes as a woman and is terrifying."   Dinamalar critic gave 3 out of 5 rating

See also 

 Malaysian Tamil Cinema

References

External links 
 Poochandi's official Facebook page
 

2022 films
2020s Tamil-language films
2022 horror thriller films
Malaysian horror thriller films
Tamil-language Malaysian films